Keighley is a civil parish in the metropolitan borough of the City of Bradford, West Yorkshire, England.  It contains 192 listed buildings that are recorded in the National Heritage List for England.  Of these, three are listed at Grade I, the highest of the three grades, three are at Grade II*, the middle grade, and the others are at Grade II, the lowest grade.  The parish includes the town of Keighley, the settlements of East Morton, Hainworth, Ingrow, Laycock, Oakworth, Oldfield, Riddlesden, and Utley, and the surrounding countryside and moorland.

Until the late 18th century Keighley was a market town, and it then became a centre for the textile industry, with a great growth of population during the 19th century.  The surrounding area is almost completely rural, with small scattered settlements.  Most of the listed buildings are houses, cottages and associated structures, farmhouses, and farm buildings.  The other listed buildings include boundary markers, a cross base, a cross built into a wall, a former corn mill and textile mills, guidestones, mileposts, an aqueduct and bridge on the Leeds and Liverpool Canal, public houses, road bridges, a footbridge, a clapper bridge, two former packhorse bridges, churches, chapels and associated structures, a drill hall, civic buildings, railway stations and associated structures, a bank, offices and shops, a limekiln, and three telephone kiosks.


Key

Buildings

References

Citations

Sources

 

Lists of listed buildings in West Yorkshire
 Listed